This article summarizes Japanese football in the 2022 season.

National teams

Source: JFA

Men's

Senior

U-23

Fixtures & Results (U-23), JFA.jp

U-21

Fixtures & Results (U-21), JFA.jp

U-20

U-17

Futsal

U-20 futsal

Beach soccer

Esports football

Women's

Senior

U-20

U-17

Futsal

League competitions

Men

Promotion and relegation

J1 League

J2 League

J3 League

Japan Football League (JFL)

Women

Promotion and relegation

WE League

Nadeshiko League

Cup competitions

Men

Fujifilm Super Cup

Final

Emperor's Cup

Final

J.League YBC Levain Cup

Final

Women

Empress's Cup

Final

Deaths
 7 January 2022: Tadatoshi Komine, 76, who managed Nagasaki Prefectural Shimabara Commercial High School, Nagasaki Prefectural Kunimi High School High, school attached to Nagasaki Institute of Applied Science and Japan national under-17 football team.

See also
Japan Football Association (JFA)

Notes

References

External links
Japan Football Association (JFA) 
List of International matches – JFA.jp 
Japan National Teams 2022 Schedule – JFA.jp (as of 17 December 2021)

 
Seasons in Japanese football